Andrew Quy (born 4 July 1976) is an English retired footballer who played as a goalkeeper, most notably in the Conference for Hereford United. After retiring as a footballer, he became a goalkeeping coach and worked with the first team squads at Lincoln City, Stoke City, Brentford and Burton Albion. He is currently assistant coach at Charlotte FC.

Playing career
Quy was born in Harlow and began his career with Tottenham Hotspur on a YTS contract. After failing to win a professional contract at White Hart Lane, he transferred to Derby County in July 1994 and subsequently spent time out on loan at Stalybridge Celtic. Following another non-playing spell at Grimsby Town during the 1996–97 season, Quy had short spells with Stevenage Borough and Kettering Town, before finally finding regular football with Hereford United in 1997. However, his career was cut short by injury and after spells with Halesowen Town and Belper Town, Quy decided to take up coaching.

Coaching career
Quy began his coaching career in the Derby County and Aston Villa academies and was appointed as part-time first team goalkeeping coach at Lincoln City in 2006. In 2007, he joined Stoke City as first team goalkeeping coach. In January 2019, Quy and Kevin Russell assisted Stoke's caretaker manager Rory Delap. In December 2019, Quy left his role at Stoke and joined Brentford until the end of the 2019–20 season. In February 2021, Quy was appointed Head of Goalkeeping at Burton Albion and he served in the role until late October, when he took up the combined role of first team and academy goalkeeping coach at Major League Soccer expansion team Charlotte FC. Following the sacking of head coach Miguel Ángel Ramírez in May 2022, Quy relinquished his goalkeeping coach duties and was made a member of the interim coaching team, serving head coach Christian Lattanzio as an assistant alongside Jamath Shoffner. In January 2023, he was appointed to the role full-time.

Career statistics

References

External links

Living people
1976 births
Sportspeople from Harlow
Tottenham Hotspur F.C. players
Derby County F.C. players
Stalybridge Celtic F.C. players
Grimsby Town F.C. players
Stevenage F.C. players
Kettering Town F.C. players
Hereford United F.C. players
English Football League players
National League (English football) players
Stoke City F.C. non-playing staff
Association football goalkeepers
English footballers
Brentford F.C. non-playing staff
Belper Town F.C. players
Northern Premier League players
Southern Football League players
Derby County F.C. non-playing staff
Aston Villa F.C. non-playing staff
Lincoln City F.C. non-playing staff
Burton Albion F.C. non-playing staff
Charlotte FC non-playing staff
English expatriate sportspeople in the United States